Baizat Khamidovna Khamidova (born 31 August 1990) is a Russian rugby sevens player. She competed in the women's tournament at the 2020 Summer Olympics.

References

External links
 

1990 births
Living people
Russian female rugby sevens players
Olympic rugby sevens players of Russia
Rugby sevens players at the 2020 Summer Olympics
People from Dagestan
Sportspeople from Dagestan
20th-century Russian women
21st-century Russian women